Bardeh Kuyeh (also Romanized as Bardeh Kūyeh; also known as Bard Kooyeh) is a village in Mohr Rural District, in the Central District of Mohr County, Fars Province, Iran. At the 2006 census, its population was 464, in 89 families.

References 

Populated places in Mohr County